Ron Ganulin (born May 15, 1945) is an American basketball coach.  He is an assistant men's basketball coach at St. Francis College in Brooklyn, New York. Ganulin served as the head men's basketball coach at New York Institute of Technology from 1980 to 1982 and at St. Francis from 1991 to 2005.

Biography
Before he began his coaching career, Ganulin played collegiate basketball at Long Island University, where he graduated with a Bachelor of Science degree in 1968. During his senior season, LIU advanced to the Division II National Collegiate Semifinals.

Prior to his tenure at St. Francis, Ganulin reached the pinnacle of the college basketball world as an assistant coach with UNLV. Ganulin helped the team capture the 1990 NCAA National Championship. During his four-year stay in Las Vegas, the Rebels enjoyed a 126–23 record.

After St. Francis College, Ganulin served as the coordinator of player development for the Wizards during the 2005–06 season.

Coach Ganulin also coached the boys junior varsity, as head coach, and assistant coach for varsity basketball, at the Yeshiva University High School for Boys in Uptown NYC.

St. Francis College
Ganulin was the head coach of St. Francis Terriers for 14 seasons, from 1991 to 2005. As head coach, Ganulin accumulated 187 wins and was twice named the Northeast Conference's Coach of the Year. During Ganulin's tenure, St. Francis finished with a .500 or better record in the league eight straight years, at that time the longest active streak in the NEC. The Terriers reached the NEC semifinals five times and had two championship game appearances. From 1998 through 2004, St. Francis posted a 78–36 conference record, which was best in the NEC. During that span, Ganulin guided the Terriers to two Northeast Conference Regular Season Championships as well as their first 20 win season in 43 years.

In 2013, Ganulin returned to St. Francis to be an assistant coach under Glenn Braica, who was his assistant during his head coaching tenure at St. Francis.

Head coaching record

References

1945 births
Living people
High school basketball coaches in the United States
LIU Brooklyn Blackbirds men's basketball players
LIU Post Pioneers men's basketball coaches
Manhattan Jaspers basketball coaches
NYIT Bears men's basketball coaches
Old Dominion Monarchs men's basketball coaches
Saint Peter's Peacocks men's basketball coaches
St. Francis Brooklyn Terriers men's basketball coaches
UNLV Runnin' Rebels basketball coaches
American men's basketball players